Plybothris luczoti  is a Jewel Beetle of the Buprestidae family.

Description

Distribution
These beetles can be found in Madagascar.

References
 Universal Biological Indexer

External links
 Virtual beetles
 Buprestidae of Madagascar

luczoti
Beetles described in 1833